The 2015 UCI Asia Tour was the 11th season of the UCI Asia Tour. The season began on 1 February 2015 with the Le Tour de Filipinas and ended on 19 December 2015 with the Tour of Al Zubarah.

The points leader, based on the cumulative results of previous races, wears the UCI Asia Tour cycling jersey. Samad Pourseyedi from Iran is the defending champion of the 2013–14 UCI Asia Tour.

Throughout the season, points are awarded to the top finishers of stages within stage races and the final general classification standings of each of the stages races and one-day events. The quality and complexity of a race also determines how many points are awarded to the top finishers, the higher the UCI rating of a race, the more points are awarded.

The UCI ratings from highest to lowest are as follows:
 Multi-day events: 2.HC, 2.1 and 2.2
 One-day events: 1.HC, 1.1 and 1.2

Events

Standings
Standings as of November 25th.

References

External links
 

 
UCI Asia Tour
2015 in men's road cycling
UCI